Briese  is a river of Brandenburg, Germany, flowing through the district (Kreise) Barnim and Oberhavel. The river is a tributary of the River Havel, which it joins in Birkenwerder.

See also 

 List of rivers of Brandenburg

Rivers of Brandenburg
Rivers of Germany